Hong Si-young (born January 24, 1991), better known by his stage name, Giriboy (Hangul: 기리보이), is a South Korean rapper, singer, songwriter,record producer,and actor signed to Just Music.

Career 
Giriboy began his musical career in 2011 with the single "You Look So Good to Me", released under Just Music, a label that had been recently founded by rapper Swings. The following year, he released the EP Fatal Album, much of which he had written years earlier as a high school student. He released a second EP titled Fatal Album II later that year.

Giriboy competed on season three of the TV show Show Me the Money in 2014. That year, he also entered the top 100 of the Gaon Digital Chart for the first time with the single "Fluttering Feelings", a collaboration with singer NS Yoon-G. The song ultimately peaked at No. 6 on the chart.

In 2015, he appeared on the reality show No Mercy, in which he collaborated on songs with the contestants (who would go on to form the boy group Monsta X) and with established artists Soyou and Mad Clown. He also released the album Sexual Perceptions, which reached No. 10 on the Gaon Album Chart in March.

In 2016, he released his fourth album, Mechanical Album. In 2017, he released his fifth EP, called 5 Songs For Initiation. In December of the same year, he released his fifth album, Graduation.

In 2018, Giriboy became the co-CEO of WEDAPLUGG Records with Just Music labelmate and CEO Swings.

Discography

Studio albums

Extended plays

Singles

As lead artist

Collaborations

Soundtrack appearances

Other charted songs

Filmography

Film

Television series

Television shows

Awards and nominations

References 

1991 births

Living people

South Korean male rappers
South Korean singer-songwriters
South Korean hip hop record producers
Show Me the Money (South Korean TV series) contestants
South Korean male singer-songwriters